Dylan Jeremy Neal (born October 8, 1969) is a Canadian/American  actor. He holds dual citizenship in Canada and the United States. He is known for his portrayal of the character Dylan Shaw on the soap opera The Bold and the Beautiful, Doug Witter on Dawson's Creek, and Detective Mike Celluci in the supernatural series Blood Ties. He also played Aaron Jacobs on Sabrina, the Teenage Witch.

In 2013, Neal landed the lead role opposite Andie MacDowell in the Hallmark Channel's first scripted TV series, Cedar Cove. The series premiered on July 20, 2013, and is based on the series of books by the same name, written by Debbie Macomber. 
In 2014, he sold a TV movie franchise to the newly rebranded Hallmark Movies and Mystery Channel and began writing, executive producing and starring as Henry Ross in Hallmark's original mystery series Gourmet Detective. As of 2018, Dylan continues to write, produce and star in a variety of movies for Hallmark.

Personal life
Dylan Neal was born in Richmond Hill, Ontario, in 1969. Four months after his birth, his family moved to Oakville, Ontario. He attended Appleby College in Oakville and initially wanted to become a professional squash player.

Neal transferred to T. A. Blakelock High School in Oakville for his last two years of schooling. It was there that he gained an interest in the performing arts and participated in his school's drama program. On the advice of his drama teacher, Neal decided he wanted to make a career of acting.

Before becoming an actor, Neal was a caterer and delivered lunch baskets to private businesses in industrial areas around Toronto.  He also delivered pizzas for a living before making it as an actor. He has been passionate about furniture making.

Neal is married to TV writer and producer Becky Southwell who has co-written some of the Gourmet Detective films with him. They were married on 21 September 1996 and have two children together.

Career
Neal has said that after finishing his work on The Bold and the Beautiful, he was initially concerned about his ability to find another acting job. "There are certain expectations--or a certain lack of expectations--of soap opera actors," he said.

From 1998 to 2003, he portrayed Doug Witter, a small-town police officer, in the WB television drama Dawson's Creek. In the final season of the series, his character was revealed to be homosexual.

In 2000, Neal played a secret agent opposite Chuck Norris in the television film The President's Man. It premiered on April 2 on CBS.

In 2007, Neal played Detective Mike Celluci in Lifetime's Canadian vampire fantasy show Blood Ties, in which he starred alongside Christina Cox and Kyle Schmid. The producers of the show ultimately chose Neal, Cox, and Schmid as the three leads of the show over other auditioning actors after observing the natural chemistry among the trio.  Neal later commented that fans often compliment the three actors for their charming on-screen chemistry and camaraderie.

Neal played the male lead opposite Andie MacDowell in the television series Cedar Cove for the Hallmark Channel. Neal played Jack Griffith, a Philadelphia reporter. He played Bob Adams, stepfather to the main character Anastasia Steele (Dakota Johnson), in the film adaptation Fifty Shades of Grey (2015).

Neal and his wife, Becky Southwell, write and produce their own projects through Southwell Neal Entertainment. They write and executive produce the Gourmet Detective original films for Hallmark Movies & Mysteries, based on the novels by Peter King. As of February 2020, Neal has made five television movies based on the character.

Filmography

Films

Television

References

External links

TV tome page
Dylan Neal Acting Studio

1969 births
Male actors from Ontario
Appleby College alumni
Canadian male film actors
Canadian male television actors
Living people
People from Richmond Hill, Ontario